Matthew Rowe (born 19 May 1977) is a British short track speed skater. He competed in the men's 5000 metre relay event at the 1998 Winter Olympics.

References

External links
 

1977 births
Living people
British male short track speed skaters
Olympic short track speed skaters of Great Britain
Short track speed skaters at the 1998 Winter Olympics
People from Isleworth